Joseph Francis Léo "Frank" St-Marseille (born December 14, 1939) is a Canadian former professional ice hockey forward who played right wing in the National Hockey League for the St. Louis Blues and Los Angeles Kings from 1967 to 1977. St. Marseille is of Ojibwe-Métis , French-Canadian and Finnish descent. He is from Levack, which is situated in the Sudbury regional municipality in Ontario, Canada.

Playing career
After not being drafted because he was considered too slow for the big leagues, St-Marseille played the early stages of his career starting with the Chatham Maroons. During the fall of 1962, he tried out with the Chatham Maroons of the Senior Ontario Hockey Association and made the team; he got 39 points. The Maroons then moved to the International Hockey League (1945–2001), and St-Marseille moved with the team.  He compiled a respectable 64 points in 70 games during the 1963-1964 season. The next season Chatham Maroons (IHL) dropped out of the league and St- Marseille was picked up by the Port Huron Flags, in the IHL. St-Marseille had three impressive seasons with Port Huron between 1964–67, including winning an International Hockey League playoff title, known as the Turner Cup, in 1966. He scored 97, 90 and 118 points for a total of 305 points in only 210 games.

At this point, he had worked his way through the minors and was coming off the 1967 season with Port Huron; he was named to the league second all-star team and had been signed by the expansion team St. Louis Blues. The 1967 NHL expansion opened up a whole new world of opportunities for eager young newcomers, many of whom likely would have taken far different career paths if the league had remained a closed Original Six entity. St-Marseille began playing for a minor-league team, the Kansas City Blues, mainly as an affiliate of the St. Louis Blues. However, only 11 games in with the team, St-Marseille was called up by Scotty Bowman along with his line mates Gary Sabourin and Terry Crisp. Bowman was quoted as saying they "were better than our third line in St. Louis" referring to Frank, Gary and Terry. Known as a defensive-minded forward, St-Marseille often played on checking lines that were assigned to play against the opponent's top scoring line. Despite this, he still averaged 16 goals per season during a 5-year stretch with St. Louis that saw the Blues reach three straight Stanley Cup finals (losing to the Montreal Canadiens twice and the Boston Bruins). He made the 1970 West Division All-Star team playing with great hockey legends such as Bobby Clarke and teammate Jacques Plante, who was the first NHL goaltender to wear a goaltender mask. From 1970-72 St-Marseille captained the team. He also played on both the penalty killing and power play units for the Blues, had a plus/minus rating of +37 during that 5-year period and sits tied for 6th on the all-time game-tying goals list for the Blues. In 62 playoff games with the Blues, St- Marseille tallied 19 goals and 24 assists.

Midway through the 1972–73 season, St-Marseille was traded to the Los Angeles Kings for Paul Curtis on January 27, 1973, and played the final four and a half years of his career in the NHL. St-Marseille continued his defensive forward and penalty killing roles with the Kings, but no longer played on the power play. He scored 54 goals in his tenure with the Kings, and the club made the playoffs in each of his final four seasons with them. His best performance in Los Angeles was a 53 point performance in 1974-75. His career high came in St. Louis in 1969-70 (59 points). St-Marseille finished his hockey career in 1977-78 when he played one season in the American Hockey League for the Nova Scotia Voyageurs before retiring as a player to become the Voyageurs coach; he also spent one year as an assistant coach with the Los Angeles Kings. His NHL totals in 10 NHL seasons were 140 goals and 285 assists for 425 points in 707 games.

Personal life
St-Marseille grew up in the mining town of Levack, Ontario, which is now in the City of Greater Sudbury. His father Stéphane was a violinist, his grandfather, Adélard, was a baritone and his aunt also sang. Frank's older brother Frédéric Stéphane St-Marseille died at the age of 73 from congestive heart failure; he performed all over the world with major opera companies. While St-Marseille would become a professional hockey player, he left the game of hockey when he decided to move back to Canada to help his sons  Rob St-Marseille and Chris St-Marseille develop as a hockey player. Rob was drafted in 1982 by Kingston of the Ontario Hockey League., He also played at Lake Superior State University. He now is a constable for the Sudbury detachment of the Ontario Provincial Police. Chris played junior hockey for the Rayside Balfour Canadians (NOJHL) and tried out for the North Bay Cententials (OHL). Chris has two sons, Ben and Alex, who both played junior hockey. Frank's daughter Lizanne has a son, Joe Ranger, who currently plays in goal for the Sudbury Wolves (OHL).

In 1988, a Hall of Fame was established in Valley East, and St-Marseille and Ron Duguay were the first athletic members to be inducted. Frank’s career has been celebrated with a Major Peewee Championship being named after him in the Nickel District Minor Hockey League.

Career statistics

Coaching Record

Notes 

1939 births
Living people
Canadian ice hockey forwards
Franco-Ontarian people
Los Angeles Kings coaches
Los Angeles Kings players
Ice hockey people from Ontario
St. Louis Blues players
Sportspeople from Greater Sudbury
First Nations sportspeople
Canadian ice hockey coaches